The Ministry of Children, Seniors and Social Development is a provincial government department in Newfoundland and Labrador, Canada. The department is headed by a member of the provincial cabinet, typically a Member of the House of Assembly, who is chosen by the premier and formally appointed by the Lieutenant-Governor of Newfoundland and Labrador.

The department's creation was announced in April 2009, by the government of Danny Williams. Before becoming a stand-alone department many aspects of the department were a branch within the Department of Health and Community Services.

Child and Youth Services is responsible for: child protection services, foster care, adoption, kinship, youth services, and youth corrections programs. The department is also responsible for the disability policy office, adult protection, and seniors advocacy.

The department was reconfigured as the Department of Children, Seniors and Social Development in 2016.

In a report released in November 2016, NL Auditor General Terry Paddon said 6,252 children — eight percent of the children in Newfoundland and Labrador — were being served by CSSD (Child and Youth Services) programs.

In 2021, the income support division of Immigration, Skills and Labour was relocated into CSSD.

Background
Up until 1997, the responsibility for child protection services in Newfoundland and Labrador was under the purview of the Department of Social Services (DSS). In 1997, DSS was renamed the Department of Human Resources and Employment (DHRE). On April 1, 1998, the Department of Health and Community Services (DHCS) assumed responsibility for child protection services. The responsibility for child protection services was therefore devolved from the DHRE to a number of Health and Community Services (HCS) Boards. In 2009, the Government of Newfoundland and Labrador established the Department of Child, Youth and Family Services (DCYFS).

Ministers
Key:

See also
Executive Council of Newfoundland and Labrador
Murder of Zachary Turner
Mount Cashel Orphanage

References

External links
Department of Children, Seniors and Social Development website

Newfoundland and Labrador government departments and agencies
Child welfare in Canada
Social work organizations in Canada